The Apples is an Israeli band, consisting of a drummer, upright bassist, 4 brass, 2 DJs and a sound console operator. They play funk, jazz and groove.

The Apples started out in 2002, when a friend assembled the members of RadioTrip (Ofer Tal, known as SchoolMaster, and Uri Wertheim, known as MixMonster), drummer Yoni Halevy and bassist Shai Ran. The idea was to create a funky base combined with samples, scratching, and a dominant brass division. Their first impressions were actually spontaneous improvisations, which formed the basis of The Apple's first album, "Mitz" (Hebrew for "juice"), published on 2003, which was recorded in one recording session.

Their second album, "Attention!" was released in October 2005. The album launch was accompanied by a tour culminating in New Year's Eve at the "Comfort" club in Tel Aviv in front of an audience of about 700 people. The UK edition of "Attention!" was released in 2006. The record contains a bonus  track: "Strip Ahskrac 'first Hebrew'". In May 2008, The Apples released their third album "Buzzin' About", and in 2010, they released their fourth album, "Kings". The band collaborated with Fred Wesley, the Trombonist musical director of James Brown, and Shlomo Bar, lead singer Natural Selection.

Band members
 Yonadav Halevy – drums
 Elad Muskatel – double bass
 Arthur Krasnobaev – trumpet
 Yaron Ouzana – trombone
 Oleg Nayman – tenor and soprano saxophone
 Yakir Sasson – baritone saxophone
 Marky Funk - turntables
 Erez Todres – turntables
 Uri "MixMonster" Wertheim – sound and effects

Past members 
 Shai Ran – double bass
 Alon Carmeli – double bass
 Ofer "SchoolMaster" Tal – turntables
 Yuval Tabachnik – baritone saxophone

Discography

Studio albums
 Mitz (2003)
 Attention! (2005)
 Buzzin' About (2008)
 Kings (2010)
 Fly On It (2012)
 Dragonz (2016)

Appearances 
 Mediterranean Grooves and Raw Sounds (2011)
 Thang (previously unreleased)

External links 
 Bandcamp page
 Nadav Lazar, Apples of Gold: The Appearance Of The Apples Groove, BBC, 2/20/2009
 Eran Swissa, Fresh Apples: An Interview With The Band The Apples, BBC

Notes 

Musical groups established in 2002
Israeli funk musical groups
2002 establishments in Israel